Lympstone Commando railway station is a railway station situated on the Avocet Line, a branch line from Exeter to Exmouth in Devon, England.

The station is for the exclusive use of visitors to the Royal Marine Commando Training Centre at Lympstone. Access is through a locked gate although there is a public foot and cycle path alongside the station which separates it from the commando base.

History
The station was opened on 3 May 1976 by British Rail.  This caused some confusion with the older Lympstone railway station,  but this has since been renamed "Lympstone Village". It was built using cast platform sections recovered from Weston Milton railway station where the track had been singled and so one platform was no longer needed.

For many years troop trains were a feature of its operation about three times each year.  The trains were operated with a locomotive at each end as there is no way to run around a train south of Topsham; the leading locomotive on arrival was dragged back to Exeter Central where it was detached.  The trains were considerably longer than the platform and loading the passengers was a slow operation as they had to make their way through the train from the centre coaches.  A similar operation today is difficult to arrange as the regular timetabled passenger service is much more intensive than in the 1980s.

Description
The station is situated on the banks of the estuary of the River Exe.  It consists of a single platform, which is on the left of trains arriving from Exeter.

On 28 May 2010 a section of the Exe Estuary Trail opened between Lympstone village and Exton. This runs between the platform and the entrance to the camp so the public can now access the station, although the sign on the platform still remains stating “persons alighting here must have business with the camp”. The Ministry of Defence have accepted that the station is the property of Network Rail and as such they cannot prohibit members of the public from using the station - however, persons wishing to take photographs from the platform should inform the Guard Room at the Commando Training Centre beforehand.

Services

It is a request stop, meaning that passengers alighting here must tell the conductor that they wish to do so, and those waiting to join must signal clearly to the driver as the train approaches.

References

External links

 Photographs of Lympstone Commando by Owen Dunn

Railway stations in Devon
Railway stations in Great Britain opened in 1976
Railway stations opened by British Rail
Private railway stations
Railway stations served by Great Western Railway
Railway request stops in Great Britain
Woodbury, East Devon
DfT Category F2 stations